Steve Sekely (February 25, 1899– March 9, 1979) was a Hungarian film director.  Born István Székely, he was known by several names, based on his changing professional and immigration status, including Stefan Szekely. 
He directed films in Hungarian, German, and English.

Biography

He worked as a newspaper journalist in Germany, before returning to Hungary in the early 1930s. He directed one of the most famous classic Hungarian films, the frequently revived comedy Hyppolit, a lakáj (1931). That film was remade in 2000 and the original was later digitally restored and released on DVD.

Sekely left pre-war Hungary, fleeing growing fascism and laws restricting rights and professional opportunities for Jews.

He worked in Hollywood for much of his subsequent career, directing mostly B movies and early episodic TV, although he directed his best-known English language film, the cult science fiction thriller The Day of the Triffids in the UK and returned to Hungary to direct his final film, The Girl Who Liked Purple Flowers, which was released in 1973.

Partial filmography 

 Next, Please! (1930) Germany
 The Great Longing (1930) Germany
 Hyppolit, the Butler (1931) Hungary
 Flying Gold (1932) Hungary
 A Tremendously Rich Man (1932) Germany
 Scandal in Budapest (1933)
 The Rakoczi March (1933) Austria/Germany/Hungary
 Emmy (1934) Hungary
 Romance of Ida (1934) Hungary
 Ball at the Savoy (1935) Austria/Hungary
Half-Rate Honeymoon (1936) Hungary
 Cafe Moscow (1936) Hungary
Number 111 (1938) Hungary
 Miracle on Main Street (1939) first US film
 Behind Prison Walls (1943) US
 Revenge of the Zombies (1943) US
 Women in Bondage (1943) US
 Lady in the Death House (1944) US
 Waterfront (1944) US
 My Buddy (1944) US
 Lake Placid Serenade (1944) US
 The Fabulous Suzanne (1946) US
 Blonde Savage (1947) US
 Hollow Triumph (1948) US
 Amazon Quest (1949) US
 Stronghold (1951) US
 The Empress of China (1953) West Germany
 The Missing Scientists (1955) UK
 Cartouche (1955) Italy/France
 Desert Desperadoes (1959) Italy
 The Day of the Triffids (1962) UK
 Kenner (1969) US
 The Girl Who Liked Purple Flowers (1973) Hungary

Notes

External links
 

1899 births
1979 deaths
Film people from Budapest
People from the Kingdom of Hungary
Hungarian Jews
Hungarian film directors
German-language film directors
Hungarian emigrants to the United States